A. M. Rathnam is an Indian film producer, lyricist, screenwriter, and director known for his works in Telugu and Tamil cinema. Under the gamut of Sri Surya Movies Entertainment, Hyderabad, a movie production house owned by him, he has produced blockbusters in Telugu such as Karthavyam (1990), Peddarikam (1992), Sneham Kosam (1999), and Kushi (2001). He ventured into Tamil cinema in 1996 with the blockbuster Indian, which was India's Official Entry for the Best Foreign Language Film at the Academy Awards. He then produced films such as Kushi, Run, Boys, Enakku 20 Unakku 18, Dhool, Ghilli, 7G Rainbow Colony, Arrambam, Yennai Arindhaal and Vedalam.

Personal life
Rathnam was born in Buchireddypalem of Nellore district in Andhra Pradesh. Rathnam has two sons, director and actor Jyothi Krishna and actor Ravi Krishna. Jyothi Krishna's directorial debut Enakku 20 Unakku 18 and its Telugu version, as well as Ravi Krishna's first four films, that also include Jyothi Krishna's second directorial venture Kedi, were all produced by Rathnam himself. In 2012, he built a temple for Shirdi Sai Baba at his office in Valasaravakkam.

Career
Ratnam started his career as a make-up man for superstar actress Vijayashanti. Being the Executive Producer for the actress, he produced his first film Karthavyam, in 1990. Vijayashanti won the National Award for the Best Actress for this film. He made films with Kamal Haasan, Chiranjeevi and many other actors. He later began producing films in Tamil and Hindi as well, dubbing and releasing several films in other languages. He went on to finance Shankar's Indian, which earned him the Filmfare Award for Best Film – Tamil and was later submitted by India for the Academy Award for Best Foreign Language Film, Nayak: The Real Hero and Sneham Kosam starring Chiranjeevi.

Rathnam produced the Tamil romance film Kushi, starring Vijay and its same-titled Telugu remake the following year, starring Pawan Kalyan, both of which were directed by S. J. Surya and became highly successful. Later, he produced two more films, Ghilli and Sivakasi starring Vijay. Both Ghilli and Sivakasi were highly successful at the box office. During the early 1990s, he directed two films Peddarikam and Sankalpam in Telugu. He has also written the screenplay for the film Naaga. Later, he changed the name of his production company from Sri Surya Movies Entertainment to Shri Sai Raam Creations, which is now headed by S. Aishwarya. He had done three films with Ajith Kumar such as Arrambam, Yennai Arindhaal and Vedalam, all of which were huge success.

Awards
Filmfare Awards South
 Filmfare Award for Best Film - Telugu – Karthavyam (1990) 
 Filmfare Award for Best Film – Tamil – Indian (1996)
 Filmfare Award for Best Film – Tamil – Natpukkaga  (1998)

Tamil Nadu State Film Awards
 Tamil Nadu State Film Award for Best Film (First Prize) – Indian  (1996) 
 Tamil Nadu State Film Award for Best Film (First Prize) – Natpukkaga (1998)

Others
 Cinema Express Award for Best Film – Tamil – Indian  (1996)

Filmography
Producer

Distributor
Vyjayanthi IPS (1990)
Gentleman (1993, Telugu)
Premikudu (1994, Telugu Dubbed version of Kadhalan)
The King (1995) (Tamil dubbed version of Malayalam film The King)
Unnaiye Kalyanam Pannikiren (1996) (Tamil dubbed version of Telugu film Ninne pelladatha)
Arunachalam (1997, Telugu)
Jeans (1998, Telugu)
Oke Okkadu (1999, Telugu Dubbed Version of Mudhalvan)

Lyricist
Jeans (film) - Telugu version
Oke Okkadu - Telugu version of Mudhalvan
Boys (2003 film) - Telugu version
Naaga - Entha Chinna Muddu, Macarina, Oka Konte, Megham Karigenu

References

External links
 

Film producers from Andhra Pradesh
Tamil film producers
Telugu film producers
Living people
Telugu people
Year of birth missing (living people)
People from Nellore district